Black Smoke Trigger is a hard rock/alternative rock band from Napier, New Zealand, founded in 2018. They released their first EP Set It Off in 2019. The band takes influences from acts such as Audioslave, Alice in Chains and Guns N' Roses. Black Smoke Trigger is managed by US artist manager Andy Gould, (Spectacle Entertainment Group) who has also handled the careers of Rob Zombie, Pantera, Linkin Park, Lionel Richie, and Guns N' Roses.

Overview

Black Smoke Trigger's debut EP, Set It Off, was recorded with German producer Michael Wagener in Nashville, Tennessee. 

The band performed with Like a Storm for a NZ wide tour celebrating 10 years of Devilskin in October 2019.

In November 2019, Black Smoke Trigger released a new song featuring Mötley Crüe guitarist Mick Mars, titled "The Way I'm Wired".

Set It Off has landed in the Billboard charts, taking #13 Heatseekers Albums, #46 Rock Album Sales, #6 Heatseekers - South Atlantic, and #43 Independent  Album Sales, in the first week of release.

History 
From small-town beginnings in the tourist-city of Napier in New Zealand the lineup sounds quite bad came together with a shared goal of musically conquering distant shores, following in the footsteps of the rock icons that first inspired them. The Black Smoke Trigger band members all grew up in homes full of music. Rasmussen's childhood soundtrack was rife with AC/DC, Elton John, Neil Diamond and Guns N' Roses. Starting guitar at the age of 12, he soon branched into writing his own songs – learning drums and bass along the way – and went on to join various local bands. 

He met Wallace when the two were only about 13. At a party, Rasmussen played Wallace some demos of songs he'd done. He was looking for a singer. Wallace was blown away by his friend's powerful voice on the tunes and told him that he was the one who needed to be the singer. Emboldened, Rasmussen took on front-man duties for his band, his assurance growing with each live gig.  

Wallace's own first musical epiphany as a kid was hearing “Paranoid”. He looked for the song online but came across a guitar tab instead. “I picked up the dusty guitar from down the garage, and that was all it took the self-taught guitarist, who moves easily between neo-classical shredding and tasteful, gutsy solos, was teaching guitar in schools by 16.

Bassist Fulton likewise grew up with music cranked at home, and he and his older brother-guitarist were obsessed with the live version of “Stairway to Heaven.” “We were both totally determined to learn the guitar solo, but because he's the big brother, he decided he needed a bass player,” It turns out bass was a natural fit for Fulton, who found a love of John Paul Jones, Faith No More and “busy Motown-y flavored parts.” 

Like his bandmates, Josh Te Maro paid his dues in local lineups. He moves easily from his massive double-kick sound to one that serves the song, learning from producer Wagener that “less can sometimes be more.”

The band recorded the EP Set It Off in Nashville, USA with Michael Wagener, landing in the Billboard charts, taking #13 Heatseekers Albums, #46 Rock Album Sales, #6 Heatseekers - South Atlantic, and #43 Independent  Album Sales, in the first week of release.  Black Smoke Trigger returned home to a nationwide tour supporting Devilskin. securing a host of fans at each show.

The stellar songs and success of Black Smoke Trigger's debut EP, Set It Off launched the band. With millions of views on Facebook / YouTube / Spotify for Set It Off’s two singles --"Caught In The Undertow" and "You Can Have it All" – the stage is set for the next big step. Legendary producer Michael Wagener (Metallica, Ozzy Osbourne, Mötley Crüe), who produced Set It Off, says, “I loved their music from the minute we met. The songs are kick-ass and we had a hard time picking which ones should go on the record.” Black Smoke Trigger were also honored with a special guest for Set It Off: Mötley Crüe guitarist Mick Mars adds his playing to the EP's edgy third song, “The Way I'm Wired.”

In 2021 Black Smoke Trigger signed with heavyweight US artist manager Andy Gould, who has also handled the careers of Rob Zombie, Pantera, Linkin Park, Lionel Richie, and Guns N' Roses. Gould, who works for Los Angeles-based Spectacle Entertainment Group, was first turned on to Black Smoke Trigger's music after being impressed by the band's video for their first single "Caught In the Undertow". “It was everything I love about rock music,” said Gould. “The visuals and song were great. Digging deeper, I realized this band had crazy talent, and it was something I had to be involved with.”

April 2022 the band entered the Rock Falcon Studio in Nashville with producer Nick Raskulinecz, to record their first full-length album. This time around the band has collaborated with Disturbed’s David Draiman, Marti Frederickson (Aerosmith, Ozzy Osbourne), Blair Daly and Zac Maloy (Shinedown, Lynyrd Skynyrd, Keith Urban), and Keith Wallen (of Breaking Benjamin).  “Our first EP was really an homage to our influences,” said Wallace. “Since then we’ve had a lot of time to sit together in a room to write and play, and our new material is representative of who we are as a band in 2022.”

Members 
 Josh "Baldrick" Rasmussen – vocals

 Charlie Wallace – guitar

 Dan Fulton – bass

 Josh Te Maro – drums

Discography

Extended Plays 
 2019: Set It Off

Singles 

 2019 - "Caught In The Undertow"
 2019 - "You Can Have It All"

Music Videos

References

New Zealand hard rock musical groups